Doggerel, or doggrel, is poetry that is irregular in rhythm and in rhyme, often deliberately for burlesque or comic effect. Alternatively, it can mean verse which has a monotonous rhythm, easy rhyme, and cheap or trivial meaning. 

The word is derived from the Middle English dogerel, probably a derivative of dog. In English it has been used as an adjective since the 14th century and a noun since at least 1630.

Appearing since ancient times in the literatures of many cultures, doggerel is characteristic of nursery rhymes and children's song.

Examples
The Scottish poet William McGonagall (1825-1902) has become famous for his doggerel, which many remember with affection despite its seeming technical flaws, as in his poem "The Tay Bridge Disaster":

Hip hop lyrics have also explored the artful possibilities of doggerel.

Chaucer's Tale of Sir Thopas is written in this format. It irritates the Host of The Tabard so much that he interrupts him and makes him tell a different tale.

See also

 Accentual verse
 Crambo
 Knittelvers
 Nonsense poetry
 Poetaster

References

Genres of poetry
Incompetence